Jamstack, previously stylized as JAMStack, is a web development architecture pattern and solution stack. The initialism "JAM" stands for JavaScript, API and Markup (generated by a static site generator) and was coined by Mathias Biilmann in 2015. The idea of combining the use of JavaScript, APIs, and markup together has existed since the beginnings of HTML5.

In Jamstack websites, the application logic typically resides on the client side (for example, an embedded e-commerce checkout service that interacts with pre-rendered static content), without being tightly coupled to a backend server. Jamstack sites are usually served with a Git-based or headless CMS.

See also 
Named "Stacks"

 LAMP (software bundle)
 MEAN (solution stack)
 LYME (software bundle)

References 

Web design
JavaScript software